Amanda Ragan (born September 20, 1954) is an Iowan State Senator from the 27th District. A member of the Democratic Party, she has served in the Iowa Senate since 2002. In 2016 Ragan was appointed Iowa Senate Democratic Whip.  She has also served as the Executive Director of Meals on Wheels and of Community Kitchen of Northern Iowa.

Ragan served on several committees in the Iowa Senate – the Appropriation committee; the Natural Resources committee; the Rules and Administration committee; the Veterans Affairs committee; and the Human Resources committee, where she is chair. She also serves on the Health and Human Services Appropriations Subcommittee, where she is vice chair.

Iowa State Senate 
Ragan is currently an assistant majority leader in the Senate. Ragan first joined the Senate when she won a special election to fill the vacancy caused by Republican Senator Merlin Bartz's resignation.

In 2005 Ragan was targeted by several groups for her opposition to a proposed amendment banning gay marriage in the state of Iowa.

Ragan was re-elected in 2006 with 15,138 votes (70%), defeating Republican opponent Kenneth D. Young.

In 2008 as chair of the Senate Human Resources Committee Ragan was a direct player in the formulation of health care legislation that would cover more Iowan children and fix health care problems in the state of Iowa.

Ragan was again re-election to the Iowa State Senate in 2010. Ragan defeated Republican candidate James Mills by a margin of 12,908 (60.4%) to 8,452 (39.4%).

References

External links 
Amanda Ragan official campaign site
Senator Amanda Ragan official Iowa Legislature site
Senator Amanda Ragan official Iowa General Assembly site
State Senator Amanda Ragan official constituency site
 

1954 births
Living people
Democratic Party Iowa state senators
Women state legislators in Iowa
American nonprofit executives
People from Mason City, Iowa
21st-century American politicians
21st-century American women politicians